Tiền Hải is a township and capital of Tiền Hải District, Thái Bình Province, Vietnam.

References

Populated places in Thái Bình province
District capitals in Vietnam
Townships in Vietnam